Demetrius was the second Patriarch of the Bulgarian Orthodox Church and the first one to have been recognized by the Ecumenical Patriarch of Constantinople as a result of the Byzantine–Bulgarian Treaty of 927, which affirmed the Bulgarian victory in the War of 913–927 against the Byzantine Empire. Demetrius headed the Bulgarian Patriarchate in the first years of the reign of emperor Peter I (r. 927–969).

Demetrius was mentioned as the second Patriarch of Bulgaria in the Book of Boril, written in 1211. It is likely that Demetrius resided in the city of Drastar on the river Danube rather than in the capital of the Bulgarian Empire Preslav. He was succeeded by Sergius.

References

Sources 
 
 

10th-century deaths
10th-century archbishops
10th-century Bulgarian people
Patriarchs of Bulgaria
People from Veliki Preslav